Volker Ludwig Mehrmann (born 1955) is a German mathematician.

Education and career
At Bielefeld University he completed his PhD in 1982 under Ludwig Elsner and his Habilitation in 1987 with a dissertation on control theory. Mehrmann was from 1990 to 1992 a Vertretungsprofessor (interim professor) at the RWTH Aachen University. From 1993 to 2000 he was a professor at the Chemnitz University of Technology. Since 2000 he has been a professor at the Institute for Mathematics at the Technical University of Berlin. From June 2008 to May 2016 he was the spokesperson for the Deutsche Forschungsgemeinschaft's mathematical center called Matheon. From January 2011 to December 2013 he was president of the Gesellschaft für Angewandte Mathematik und Mechanik (GAMM). In 2011 he received from the European Research Council (ERC) an advanced grant for modeling, simulation, and control of multiphysics systems. From 2019 to 2022 he is president of the European Mathematical Society (EMS).

Mehrmann is a member of the Deutschen Akademie der Technikwissenschaften (Acatech) and of Academia Europaea. In 2015 he gave the Gauss Lecture. He was awarded in 2018 the W. T. and Idalia Reid Prize and in 2019 the Hans Schneider Prize in Linear Algebra. He was named a Fellow of the American Mathematical Society, in the 2022 class of fellows, "for contributions to scientific computing and numerical linear algebra, and service and leadership in the mathematical community".

Mehrmann's research deals with numerical linear algebra, differential-algebraic equations, and control theory. Volker Mehrmann is on the editorial staffs of several journals, including Linear Algebra and Its Applications and Numerische Mathematik.

Selected publications

References

External links
 
 

20th-century German mathematicians
21st-century German mathematicians
Numerical analysts
Members of Academia Europaea
Bielefeld University alumni
Academic staff of the Technical University of Berlin
1955 births
Living people
Academic staff of the Chemnitz University of Technology
Electronic Journal of Linear Algebra editors
Fellows of the American Mathematical Society
European Research Council grantees
Presidents of the European Mathematical Society